Fairhope is a city in Baldwin County, Alabama, United States, located on the eastern shoreline of Mobile Bay. The 2020 Census lists the population of the city as 22,477. Fairhope is a principal city of the Daphne-Fairhope-Foley metropolitan area, which includes all of Baldwin County.

History 

Fairhope was founded in November 1894 on the site of the former Alabama City as a Georgist "Single-Tax" colony by the Fairhope Industrial Association, a group of 28 followers of economist Henry George who had incorporated earlier that year in Des Moines, Iowa. Their corporate constitution explained their purpose in founding a new colony:

In forming their demonstration project, they pooled their funds to purchase land at "Stapleton's pasture" on the eastern shore of Mobile Bay and then divided it into a number of long-term leaseholds. The corporation paid all governmental taxes from rents paid by the lessees, thus simulating a single-tax. The purpose of the single-tax colony was to eliminate disincentives for productive use of land and thereby retain the value of land for the community.

"Fairhope Avenue" was one of the properties on the 1910 version of the board game The Landlord's Game, a precursor of Monopoly.

In 1907, educator Marietta Johnson founded the School for Organic Education in Fairhope. The school was praised in John Dewey's influential 1915 book Schools of Tomorrow. Dewey and Johnson were founding members of the Progressive Education Association.

Fairhope became a popular wintering spot for artists and intellectuals. Sherwood Anderson, Clarence Darrow, Wharton Esherick, Carl Zigrosser, and Upton Sinclair were among its notable visitors.

Despite the ideals of the corporation, the town has transitioned from utopian experiment to artists' and intellectuals' colony to boutique resort and affluent suburb of Mobile. White flight from nearby Mobile has caused the population of Baldwin County to almost triple since the 1940s, and particularly since desegregation, contributing to the mostly-White demographics of Daphne, Fairhope, and Spanish Fort.

In 2019 the New York Times termed Fairhope to be "A Southern Town That’s Been Holding On to Its Charm, for More Than a Century".

Geography 

Fairhope is located on the shore of Mobile Bay. U.S. Route 98 (Greeno Road) runs north–south through the city. It lies on a sloping plateau.

Climate 

Fairhope has a humid subtropical climate.

Demographics

2020 census

As of the 2020 United States census, there were 22,477 people, 7,790 households, and 5,606 families residing in the city.

2010 census
As of the census of 2010, there were 15,326 people, 6,732 households, and 4,395 families residing in the city. The racial makeup of the city was 91.1% White, 6.2% Black, 0.7% Asian, 0.2% Native American, 0.0% Pacific Islander, 0.9% from other races, and 0.8% from two or more races. 2.8% of the population were Hispanic or Latino of any race.

There were 6,732 households, out of which 25.9% had children under the age of 18 living with them, 53.6% were married couples living together, 9.1% had a female householder with no husband present, and 34.7% were non-families. 31.2% of all households were made up of individuals, and 17.1% had someone living alone who was 65 years of age or older. The average household size was 2.26 and the average family size was 2.84.

21.4% of the population was under the age of 18, 4.9% from 18 to 24, 20.4% from 25 to 44, 28.5% from 45 to 64, and 23.7% who were 65 years of age or older. The median age was 46 years. For every 100 females, there were 86.4 males. For every 100 females age 18 and over, there were 86.3 males. The median income for a household in the city was $66,157, and the median income for a family was $93,549. Males had a median income of $60,591 versus $36,218 for females. The per capita income for the city was $35,086. About 5.0% of families and 5.9% of the population were below the poverty line, including 9.8% of those under age 18 and 4.6% of those age 65 or over.

Government 
Fairhope is governed by a mayor and five-person city council which was last elected in 2016. The mayor serves as the full-time city executive, while council members serve part-time.

Mayor: Sherry Sullivan.
Council members:
 Jack Burrell
 Corey Martin
 Jimmy Conyers
 Robert Brown
 Kevin Boone

Development 

Local and national real estate developers have built commercial facilities in the downtown area that are larger than have been historically allowed.

Fairhope's building and zoning ordinances overlap with those of Baldwin County. Residents of the city want more control of construction projects near, but still outside the city limits, while residents outside the city limits want less city control of their property.

Education 

Fairhope's public schools are part of the Baldwin County Public Schools system:
 Fairhope High School (912)1,142 students, Principal Jon Cardwell. Fairhope High School is located in the southernmost part of Fairhope. It is estimated that 39% of the city of Fairhope's high school age students attend Daphne High School that is north of Fairhope.
 Fairhope Middle School (78)642 students, Principal Angie Hall
 J.Larry Newton School (K6)731 students, Principal Patrice Krueger, (Barnwell, Alabama)
 Fairhope West Elementary School (K-6)826 students, Principal
 Fairhope East Elementary School (K-6)721 students, Principal

Other schools in Fairhope include:
 The Marietta Johnson School of Organic Educationcontinues to operate as a private school with approximately 20 students as of 2017. The school offers education to life groups that traditionally span 1st through 8th grades.
 St. Michael Catholic High Schoolbeginning in 2016 with grades 910, adding a grade each year thereafter for a total enrollment between 360400
 Bayshore Christian Schoolbeginning in 2002 with Kindergarten, adding a grade each year thereafter, currently offering PreK-12th grade for a total enrollment between 440480
 Faulkner State Community Collegehas a campus in Fairhope that provides adult education, undergraduate courses, non-credit and community service programs
 The University of South Alabamahas a branch campus in Fairhope providing graduate and upper-level undergraduate courses in education, counseling, nursing and business alongside non-credit and community service programs

Notable people 

 Maude Ballou, Civil Rights activist
 Pinky Bass, photographer
 Bob Baumhower, football player and businessman
 Rick Bragg, writer
 Jimmy Buffett, singer and songwriter
 Grayson Capps, singer songwriter
 Eugenia S. Chapman, educator and Illinois state representative
 Dave Edwards, musician
 Grant Enfinger, professional race car driver
 Fannie Flagg (Patricia Neal), author and actress
 Abbi Glines, writer
 Winston Groom, novelist (Forrest Gump)
 Fred Nall Hollis (Nall), artist
 Marie Howland, 19th Century utopian and journalist
 Marietta Johnson, educator and reformer
 David King, former NFL defensive back
 Leon Lett, football player
 Dean Mosher, artist, author and historian
 George M. Murray, bishop in the Episcopal Church
 Burton Ritchie, entrepreneur
 Janie Shores, Alabama Supreme Court justice
 Eddie Stanky, Former Major League Baseball player and manager
 Philip Rivers, Former NFL Quartberback
 Dave Stapleton, former baseball player
 Thompson Square, country music duo
 Bill Varney, film sound editor
 Bob Weltlich, former college basketball coach

See also 
 Eastern Shore (Alabama)
National Register of Historic Places listings in Baldwin County, Alabama, including several Fairhope districts and properties

References

Further reading 
 Dian Arnold. (1999) "Fairhope: A Sentimental Review." link
 Paul E. and Blanche R. Alyea. (1956) "Fairhope, 1894–1954: The Story of a Single Tax Colony." Tuscaloosa: University of Alabama Press.
 Paul M. Gaston. (1984) Women of Fair Hope. Athens, Georgia: University of Georgia Press. Black Belt Press, 1993.
 Paul M. Gaston. (1993) Man and Mission: E. B. Gaston and the Origins of the Fairhope Single Tax Colony. Montgomery, Alabama: Black Belt Press.
 Paul M. Gaston (2010) "Coming of Age in Utopia: The Odyssey of an Idea." Montgomery and Louisville: NewSouth Books.
 Paul M. Gaston. (2004) "My Yellow Ribbon Town: A Meditation on My Country and My Home." in Where We Stand: Voices of Southern Dissent. Montgomery, Alabama: New South Books. link
 Paul M. Gaston. (1985) "Gaston, Ernest Berry." in "Alden Whitman, ed., "American Reformers. New York: The H.W. Wilson Co.
 Mary Lois Timbes and Robert E. Bell. (2001) "Meet Me at the Butterfly Tree: A Fairhope Memoir." Fairhope: Over the Transom.
 Cathy Donelson, foreword by Fannie Flagg. (2005) "Fairhope." Charleston, South Carolina: Arcadia Publishing.
 Cathy Donelson. (2013) "Fairhope in the Roaring Twenties." Charleston, South Carolina: Arcadia Publishing.

External links 

 
 

 
1894 establishments in Alabama
Cities in Alabama
Cities in Baldwin County, Alabama
Georgist communities
Populated coastal places in Alabama
Populated places established in 1894
Utopian communities in the United States